Thaisella guatemalteca is a species of sea snail, a marine gastropod mollusk, in the family Muricidae, the murex snails or rock snails.

Distribution
This species occurs in Guatemalan part of the Caribbean Sea.

Habitat
This species is found in the following habitats:
 Brackish
 Marine

References

guatemalteca
Gastropods described in 2017